Little Saigon is a neighborhood of San Jose, California, located in East San Jose. It is a hub for Silicon Valley's Vietnamese community and one of the largest Little Saigons in the world, as San Jose has more Vietnamese residents than any city outside of Vietnam. Vietnamese Americans and immigrants in San Jose make up ten percent of the city’s population and about eight percent of the county and South Bay Area.

History

The epicenter of the Vietnamese-American community of San Jose, however, is on Story Road. home to the popular Grand Century Mall and Vietnam Town (both shopping malls are owned by Chinese-Vietnamese real estate developer Lap Tang) and is officially designated by the San Jose City Council as "Little Saigon".

Lee's Sandwiches, (a Vietnamese banh mi sandwich chain eatery) as well as the phở chain, Pho Hoa Restaurant, had their first locations here in San Jose.

In 2007, the Little Saigon district was officially created and recognized by the City of San José.

In 2021, as part of the Stop Asian Hate campaign, the San Jose Police Department increased patrols through the neighborhood, after a rise in hate crimes against Asian Americans during the COVID-19 pandemic.

Vietnamese community
Comprising over 180,000 residents, about 10.6% of the population, (as of the 2010 U.S. Census), San Jose has more Vietnamese residents than any single city outside of Vietnam.

The Vietnamese community of San Jose has been politically divided over the naming of the business district, with various groups favoring "Little Saigon", "New Saigon", and "Vietnamese Business District". Non-Vietnamese businesses and residents, as well as the San Jose Hispanic Chamber of Commerce have also opposed the name "Little Saigon".

In November 2007, the San Jose City Council voted 8–3 to choose the compromise name "Saigon Business District", resulting in ongoing protest, debate, and an effort to recall city council member Madison Nguyen, who proposed the name "Saigon Business District". On March 4, 2008, after a public meeting in which more than 1000 "Little Saigon" supporters participated, the city council voted 11–1 to rescind the name "Saigon Business District", but stopped short of renaming it.

Little Saigon is the site of celebrations every year for the Tết (Vietnamese New Year) festival.

An intercity bus service named Xe Đò Hoàng connects the Little Saigon in San Jose to the one in Orange County and various other cities in California and Arizona with high concentration of Vietnamese Americans.

Geography
Little Saigon is located in East San Jose. It is bound by the Junípero Serra Freeway (CA 280) to the north, Senter Road to the west, and the Bayshore Freeway (US 101) to the east. Its southern boundary is roughly Owsley Avenue.

The primary thoroughfare through Little Saigon is Story Road.

Gallery

References

External links

Little Saigon neighborhood profile at Visit San José

Neighborhoods in San Jose, California
Little Saigons
Ethnic enclaves in California